Cristalândia is a municipality located in the Brazilian state of Tocantins.
 
Its population was 7,278 (2020) and its area is 1,848 km².

Religion 
The town is the seat of the Territorial Prelature of Cristalândia, headquartered Cúria Prelatícia, Praça da Catedral s.n, where is also its Catedral Prelatícia Nossa Senhora do Perpétuo Socorro, the Marian cathedral dedicated to Our Lady of Perpetual Support.

Sources and References

 GCatholic, on the territorial prefecture, with Google map and picture

Municipalities in Tocantins